Amadou Aboubakar Zaki (born 10 February 1988) is a Nigerien professional basketball player, who plays for Union Rennes Basket 35. Standing at 7 ft 0 in (2.13 m), Zaki usually plays as power forward or center. Zaki has played in France and in Denmark as a professional player.

References

External links
 Svendborg Rabbits Profile
  Eurobasket.com Profile
 EuroCup Profile
 REAL GM Profile
 Scoresway Profile

1988 births
Living people
Centers (basketball)
Denain Voltaire Basket players
ESSM Le Portel players
JA Vichy-Clermont Métropole players
Lille Métropole BC players
Nigerien men's basketball players
People from Niamey
Power forwards (basketball)
SLUC Nancy Basket players
SOMB Boulogne-sur-Mer players
Svendborg Rabbits players